Catharylla gigantea is a moth of the family Crambidae described by Théo Léger and Bernard Landry in 2014. It is found in French Guiana, Guyana and the Brazilian state of Amazonas.

The length of the forewings is 13.5–14.5 mm for males and 17.5–22 mm for females. The forewings are snow white with a wide brown to dark brown costal line from the base to the apex. The median and subterminal transverse lines are faded brown. There are dark brown spots on the termen, forming a more or less continuous line. The hindwings are snow white with dark brown marginal spots.

Etymology
The species name is derived from Latin giganteus (meaning very large).

References

Argyriini
Moths of South America
Lepidoptera of Brazil
Lepidoptera of French Guiana
Lepidoptera of Guyana
Moths described in 2014